St. Paul Catholic High School
St. Petersburg Catholic High School